Amos Records was an independent record label established in Los Angeles, California by Jimmy Bowen, in 1968. The label was located on 6565 Sunset Boulevard, and had an additional office branch in New York City. With Bowen producing most of Amos Records' music artists, the label released material from 1968 to 1971, and was best remembered for issuing an album by Longbranch Pennywhistle, which consisted of material from future contributors  to of The Eagles. Other notable artists included Bing Crosby, Mel Carter, and The West Coast Pop Art Experimental Band. Some of Amos' later releases were distributed by Bell Records.

Discography

Albums
 Bing Crosby - Hey Jude / Hey Bing! AAS 7001, 1969 (US #162)
 Evergreen Blueshoes - The Ballad of Evergreen Blueshoes AAS 7002, 1969
 Lee Dresser - El Camino Real AAS 7003, 1969
 The West Coast Pop Art Experimental Band - Where's My Daddy? AAS 7004, 1969
 AAS 7005 is skipped in the sequence
 Johnny Tillotson - Tears on My Pillow AAS 7006, 1969
 Longbranch Pennywhistle - Longbranch Pennywhistle AAS 7007, 1969
 Armageddon - Armageddon AAS 7008, 1969
 Frankie Laine - Frankie Laine's Greatest Hits AAS 7009, 1970
 Mel Carter - This Is My Life AAS 7010, 1971
 Michael Seven - Michael Seven AAS 7011, 1971
 Believers - A Salute to Motown AAS 7012, 1971
 Frankie Laine - A Brand New Day AAS 7013, 1971
 Wilburn Burchette - Occult Concert AAS 7014, 1971
 Shiloh - Shiloh AAS 7015, 1971
 Kim Carnes - Rest on Me AAS 7016, 1971

Soundtrack albums
 Beneath the Planet of the Apes AAS 8001, 1970
 Vanishing Point AAS 8002, 1971

Singles
Bing Crosby - "Lonely Street" b/w "Hey Jude" AAS 111,  1969  
Jerry Fisher and Timepiece - "City Ways" b/w "Slow It Down a Little While" AAS 112, 1969  
The Great Awakening - "Amazing Grace" (Long) b/w "Amazing Grace" (Short) AAS 113, 1969  
Steve Colt Paradox - "If You Gotta Make a Fool of Somebody" b/w "Mr. Pitiful" AAS 114, 1969  
The Evergreen Blueshoes - "Johnny B. Goode" b/w "Walking Down the Line" AAS 115, 1969  
Bing Crosby - "It's All In the Game" b/w "More and More" AAS 116, 1969  
Johnny Tillotson - "Tears on My Pillow" b/w "Remember When" AAS 117, 1969  
Lee Dresser - "Abraham, Martin and John" b/w "Camino Real" AAS 118, 1969  
The West Coast Pop Art Experimental Band - "Free as a Bird" b/w "Where's My Daddy?" AAS 119, 1969  
Mel Carter - "Everything Stops for a Little While" b/w "San Francisco Is a Lonesome Town" AAS 120, 1969  
Longbranch Pennywhistle - "Don't Talk Now" b/w "Jubilee Anne" AAS 121, 1969  
Ebony Jam - "Ride On" (Vocal) b/w "Ride On" (Instrumental) AAS 122, 1969  
Erik - "Chelsea Butterfly" b/w "Midnight Rider" AAS 123, 1969  
Dove - "Baby You Came Rollin' Cross My Mind" b/w "I Can Make It with You" AAS 124,  1969  
Johnny Tillotson - "What Am I Living For?" b/w "Joy to the World" AAS 125, 1969  
Casey Anderson - "Monsoon Season Hungries" b/w "I'll Be Your Baby Tonight" AAS 126, 1969  
Frankie Avalon - "The Star" b/w "Woman Cryin'" AAS 127,  1969  
Johnny Tillotson - "Raining in My Heart" b/w "Today I Started Loving You Again" AAS 128,  1969  
Longbranch Pennywhistle - "Lucky Love" b/w "Rebecca" AAS 129, 1969  
Headstrong - "Ode to a Heffalump" b/w ? AAS 130, 1969  
The Hondells - "Follow the Bouncing Ball" b/w "The Legend of Frankie and Johnny" AAS 131,  1969  
Mel Carter - "Everything Stops for a Little While" b/w "This Is My Life" AAS 132, 1970  
Lola Falana - "Stand By Your Man" b/w "He's Chosen Me" AAS 133, 1970  
The Standards - "When You Wish Upon a Star" (Vocal) b/w "When You Wish Upon a Star" (Instrumental) AAS 134, 1970  
George Mc Cannon III - "I Fall to Pieces" b/w "Birds of All Nations" AAS 135, 1970  
Johnny Tillotson - "Susan" b/w "Love Waits for Me" AAS 136, 1970  
Casey Anderson - "Sunday Joe" b/w ? AAS 137, 1970  
Frankie Laine - "I Believe" b/w "On the Sunny Side of the Street" AAS 138, 1970  
Mel Carter - "Kiss Tomorrow Goodbye" b/w "This Is My Life" AAS 139, 1970  
Shiloh - "Jennifer" b/w "Tell Her to Get Out of Your Life" AAS 140, 1970  
Little Helen - "About Me Boy" b/w "More and More" AAS 141,  1970  
Don and Debbi - "I Can Be Happy" b/w "Shut Out" AAS 142, 1970  
 AAS 143 is skipped in the sequence  
Oxen Free and the Buffalo Hunters - "Gimme, Gimme, Gimme Your Love" b/w "Give Me Your Money" AAS 144, 1970  
Leonard Rosenman - "March of the Apes" b/w ? AAS 145, 1970  
Johnny Tillotson - "I Don't Believe in If Anymore" b/w "Kansas City, Kansas" AAS 146, 1970  
Manuela - "If I Give My Heart to You" b/w "It Takes a Lot of Tenderness" AAS 147, 1970  
Longbranch Pennywhistle - "Star Spangled Bus" b/w "Bring Back Funky Women" AAS 148, 1970  
John Bahler - "Into the Sun" b/w "Tear Down the Wall" AAS 149, 1970  
The Hondells - "Shine on Ruby Mountain" b/w "The Legend of Frankie and Johnny" AAS 150, 1970  
George Mc Cannon III - "No Love at All" b/w "Tall Oak Tree" AAS 151, 1970  
Pat Shannon - "I Ain't Got Time Anymore" b/w "I Ain't Got Time Anymore" (alternate version) AAS 152, 1970
Frankie Laine - "Put Your Hand in the Hand" b/w "Going To Newport" AJS 153, 1970
Frankie Laine - "My God And I" b/w "Don't Blame The Child" AJS 161, 1971

References

American record labels
Defunct record labels of the United States
Record labels established in 1968
Record labels disestablished in 1971
1968 establishments in California